Cumberland Bay State Park is a  state park located in the Town of Plattsburgh in Clinton County, New York. The park is located on the Cumberland Head peninsula on the western shore of Lake Champlain.

Park description
Cumberland Bay State Park offers a  sand beach, picnic tables, a playground, and playing fields. The park also hosts a campground with 152 tent and trailer sites, 18 of which include electrical hookups. The campground is open May through October.

The park is a popular location for ice fishing during the winter months.

See also
 List of New York state parks

References

External links
 New York State Parks: Cumberland Bay State Park

State parks of New York (state)
Parks in Clinton County, New York